Five Flights Up was an American five-person R&B ensemble including Geneva Crawford, Blanton McFarlin, Carlnetta Kelly, Charles Termell and J.B. Bingham.  They had a hit in 1970 with the song "Do What You Wanna Do", which was written by J.B. Bingham, arranged by Ernie Freeman, and produced by John Florez. The song, released on T-A Records, hit #37 on the Hot 100 but top 10 in Chicago, #9 on WCFL and #6 on WLS.  A follow-up single, "After the Feeling Is Gone," peaked at #89 on the Billboard pop chart.

Discography

References

American rhythm and blues musical groups
Oak Records artists